Never Eat Alone is a 2016 Canadian drama film written and directed by Sofia Bohdanowicz. The film follows a lonely grandmother as she tries to reconnect with an ex-boyfriend from her youth.

The film premiered in the Future//Present section of the Vancouver International Film Festival on October 2, 2016, where Bohdanowicz won the Emerging Canadian Director award. It also screened at the Buenos Aires International Festival of Independent Cinema as part of a 2017 retrospective of Bohdanowicz's work.

Cast 
 Joan Benac as herself
 Deragh Campbell as Audrey Benac
 George Radovics as Don Radovich

Production 
Never Eat Alone is an unorthodox documentary-fiction hybrid. Joan Benac, the grandmother character, is played by Joan Benac, Bohdanowicz's grandmother. Don Radovich, the ex-boyfriend character, is played by George Radovics, the film's producer and Bohdanowicz's partner Calvin Thomas' grandfather.

Deragh Campbell plays Audrey Benac, a character she has inhabited twice since for Bohdanowicz in the films Veslemøy's Song (2018) and MS Slavic 7 (2019). She received a Vancouver Film Critics Circle award nomination for Best Actress in a Canadian Film for her performance.

References

External links 
 
 

2016 films
Canadian drama films
Canadian docufiction films
English-language Canadian films
Films directed by Sofia Bohdanowicz
2010s English-language films
2010s Canadian films